Tracy Ryan (born 1964) is an Australian poet and novelist. She has also worked as an editor, publisher, translator, and academic.

Life
Tracy Ryan was born in Western Australia, where she grew up as part of a large family. She graduated with a Bachelor of Arts in Literature from Curtin University and studied European languages at the University of Western Australia.

She has lived in Cambridge, England, where she worked as a bookseller, tutor, editor, and writer. She was Judith E. Wilson Junior Visiting Fellow at Robinson College, Cambridge in 1998. She taught Australian Literature and Film at the University of East Anglia. She has also lived in Ohio in the USA.

She is married to poet John Kinsella and has two children.

Literary career
Tracy Ryan has published over nine books, including three novels. Her poetry has appeared in several magazines, such as Salt, Literary Review, and Cordite. She has also appeared in anthologies. Ryan is particularly interested in languages and has translated several French writers including Hélène Cixous, Maryline Desbiolles, and Francoise Han.

In the 1990s, Ryan, with John Kinsella, developed Folio(Salt), an offshoot of Salt Magazine. It publishes and co-publishes "books and chapbooks focused on a pluralist vision of contemporary poetry which extended across national boundaries and a wide range of poetic practices".

Reviewer Tim Allen, reviewing the anthology Foil, wrote of her poetry as follows: "Tracy Ryan’s poems are tightly packed vibrations of spiky conceits. They have a restless intelligence which seems to suspect everything they touch; the references are scholarly and the contention is feminist but the result is polychromatic."

The John Kinsella and Tracy Ryan Poetry Prize was established in 2005 and is open to members of the University of Cambridge. The award is for an original verse composition in any form, of 500 lines or less.

She currently has a two-year grant from the Australia Council.

Themes and inspiration
Ryan's poetry has been compared, by poet Dorothy Hewett, with Sylvia Plath, and Debra Zott, in her review of Hothouse, agrees, saying that "certainly, there are [in Ryan's poetry] the mythic underpinnings one finds in Plath's poetry, as well as that quality of imbuing the personal with highly dramatised mythic proportions" and that "it is no secret that Ryan has been influenced by Plath". However, she argues that "the very mention of Plath's name shapes, and threatens to place limits on, the reader's experience of Ryan's poetry", that "Tracy Ryan's poetry does not need the Plath myth to prop it up".

In 2001, Ryan said the following about her writing:
I don’t adhere to any particular school of thought, except in the broadest sense that my writing is inextricably bound up with my feminism. This would be the only real connector between my books. I am interested in trying to find ways in which language may be interrupted, disrupted and rejigged for feminist purposes (among others). Usually this attempt would arise from something in either my personal life or the world around me. My home state is currently enacting a legal clamp-down on women, with regard to street prostitution—passing laws that restrict women’s movements and rights to occupy space. Though such factors are often what ‘provokes’ me into a poem, the poem equally draws life off other books (like most poets, I spend a lot of time reading). I work by a kind of principle of immersion in particular poets at particular times.

Awards and nominations
1987 Mattara Poetry Prize, Winner
1994 Western Australian Premier's Book Awards Prize for Poetry: Shortlisted for Killing Delilah
1995 T. A. G. Hungerford Award for Fiction: Shortlisted for Vamp
1996 John Bray Poetry Award, Adelaide Festival: Shortlisted for Killing Delilah
1996 Times Literary Supplement: Poems on the Underground short poem competition: Joint winner
1997 National Book Council Banjo Award, Commended
1998 Western Australian Premier’s Book Award, Shortlisted
2000 Western Australian Premier's Book Awards Prize for Poetry: Winner for The Willing Eye
2007 Trudie Graham Award for Memoir, Winner
2008 Age Book of the Year Award (poetry), Shortlisted
2009 Australian Book Review Poetry Prize, Winner
2011 Western Australian Premier's Book Awards Prize for Poetry: Winner for The Argument

Works

Poetry
Killing Delilah (1994, Fremantle Arts Centre Press)
Intensities of Blue (1995, Folio, with John Kinsella)
Bluebeard in Drag (1996, Fremantle Arts Centre Press)
Slant (1997, rempress)
The Willing Eye (1999, Fremantle Arts Centre Press)
ex opere operato (2000, vagabond)
Hothouse (2002, Fremantle Arts Centre Press)
bloc notes (2007, equipage)
Scar Revision (2008, Fremantle Press)
The Argument (2011, Fremantle Press)
 Unearthed (2013, Fremantle Press)
 The Water Bearer (2018, Fremantle Press)

Novels
Vamp (1997, Fremantle Arts Centre Press)
Jazz Tango (2002, Fremantle Arts Centre Press)
Sweet (2008, Fremantle Press)

Edited
Fremantle Poets 1: New Poets

Plays
Smith Street (2001, three-act play, produced at University of Western Australia, with John Kinsella)
Strike! (2023, for production at the Southwark Playhouse, Spring, 2023)

References

Sources
Hull, Coral (1998) "Australian Poets at Work Series 1: Tracy Ryan" in Thylazine: The Australian Journal of Arts, Ethics & Literature, No. 3 Accessed: 14 May 2008
Geoff Page reviews Scar Revision by Tracy Ryan, on The Book Show, ABC-Radio National, 11 February 2008 Accessed: 14 May 2008
Ryan at AustLit Accessed: 14 May 2008
Tracy Ryan: Author Accessed: 14 May 2008
Tracy Ryan Manuscripts at the University of Western Australia Accessed: 14 May 2008
Fremantle Press : Books : Unearthed by Tracy Ryan Accessed: 8 September 2013

External links 
Tracy Ryan, her website.
Mutually Said: Poets Vegan Anarchist Pacifist, the blog that she shares with John Kinsella.
Fremantle Press, Authors, Tracy Ryan

1964 births
Living people
Australian poets
Writers from Western Australia
Academics of the University of East Anglia
Fellows of Robinson College, Cambridge
Australian women novelists
Australian women poets